"Ricochet" (sometimes rendered "Rick-o-Shay" and also as "Ricochet Romance") is a popular song. The credits show it to be written by Larry Coleman, Joe Darion, and Norman Gimbel, without apportioning the work on the lyrics and music, in 1953. In fact, since Coleman and Darion wrote "Changing Partners" the same year, with Darion as lyricist and Coleman as composer, while Gimbel wrote the English lyric for "Sway" the same year, it can be concluded that Coleman wrote the music and Darion and Gimbel the lyrics.

Versions
It was included in a 1954 film, Ricochet Romance.

The best-known version was recorded by Teresa Brewer on July 10, 1953 and released by Coral Records as catalog number 61043, peaking at number 2 on the Billboard chart in 1953. The B-side was "Too Young to Tango". "Ricochet" is one of the songs Teresa Brewer re-recorded in 1962 for her Philips label Greatest Hits album, with a new Nashville arrangement.

In the United Kingdom, the most popular version was by Joan Regan, and other versions were done by Alma Cogan and Billie Anthony.

The recording by Joan Regan With The Squadronaires was released by UK Decca Records as catalog number F 10193, and in Australia as catalogue number Y6543. It reached number 8 on the UK song chart.
The recording by Alma Cogan with Ken Mackintosh and his orchestra was made in London on November 27, 1953. It was released in 1954 by EMI on the His Master's Voice label as catalog numbers B 10615 and 7M 173. The B-side was "The Moon is Blue".

A comical version of the song is sung on the Season 4 (1955) episode of I Love Lucy ("Tennessee Bound") by "Teensy" and "Weensy," portrayed by the "Borden Twins" (sisters Marilyn and Rosalyn Borden).

An Icelandic version was made in 1978 by a comedy duo called Halli & Laddi. Halli & Laddi are brothers and comedians in Iceland. This version is called "Tvær úr tungunum", and the lyrics are written about two sisters from the countryside in Iceland, going to the capital city Reykjavik for the first time, looking for good time and trying to find companions of the opposite sex.

Listing of versions
Die 3 Jacksons  Philips  Germany	1958
Betsy Gay 	  Tops  USA	 
Enoch Light And His Orchestra  	  Waldorf  USA	 
Joan Regan with The Squadronaires  	  Decca  UK	1955
Snooky Lanson With Sy Oliver And Orchestra  	  Bell Record  USA	1954
Vicki Young Capitol  USA	1953
Vincent Lopez And His Hotel Taft Orchestra  	  Prom  USA
Alma Cogan  His Master's Voice  UK	1954
Halli & Laddi  1978
Björk Guðmundsdóttir & Tríó Guðmundar Ingólfssonar  1990

See also
 Ricochet (Tangerine Dream album), 1975

References

External links
Song lyric

1953 songs
Teresa Brewer songs
Songs with music by Larry Coleman
Songs with lyrics by Joe Darion
Songs with lyrics by Norman Gimbel